Macrosternodesmidae is a family of flat-backed millipedes in the order Polydesmida. There are about 9 genera and 16 described species in Macrosternodesmidae.

Genera
 Caucasodesmus
 Chaetaspis Bollman, 1887
 Harpogonopus
 Macrosternodesmus
 Ophiodesmus Cook, 1895
 Scytalosoma
 Tidesmus
 Titanosoma
 Verhoeffodesmus

References

Further reading

 
 
 
 

Polydesmida
Millipede families